East Harbor State Park is a public recreation area located  northwest of Sandusky, Ohio on the shores of Lake Erie. The state park includes beach, campground, marina, and wetland wildlife preserve areas. The park offers swimming, boating and fishing,  of multi-use trails, picnicking, hunting, and disc golf.

Beach
A thin stretch of sand beach juts northward into the waters of Lake Erie, separating Middle Harbor from the lake. Part of this beach was damaged in 1972 by a storm washing away a large section of the two-mile (3 km) beach. The current beach is a much smaller area to the north of the park, where swimming is permitted. Four segmented offshore breakwaters have been constructed on the northern section of beach, to sustain what is left of the sandy shoreline.

References

External links
East Harbor State Park Ohio Department of Natural Resources
East Harbor State Park Map Ohio Department of Natural Resources 

State parks of Ohio
Protected areas of Ottawa County, Ohio
Protected areas established in 1947
1947 establishments in Ohio